George Edward Myatt (June 14, 1914 – September 14, 2000) was an American Major and Minor League Baseball player, coach, and manager. An infielder, Myatt came by three nicknames: Foghorn, for his loud voice; Mercury, for his speed on the bases; and Stud, a name he applied to almost every other player, coach and manager he encountered in baseball. 

Myatt was a native Denver, Colorado, who grew up in El Segundo, California, where he graduated from high school.

Playing career
He entered professional baseball in 1933. In 1936, Boston Red Sox general manager Eddie Collins traveled to San Diego to scout Myatt and Bobby Doerr in a Pacific Coast League game, but came away more impressed with his 17-year-old teammate, a San Diegan and a recent Hoover High School graduate. So Collins passed on Myatt and acquired Ted Williams, who became perhaps the greatest modern hitter and was elected, as were Collins and Doerr, to the Baseball Hall of Fame.

Myatt, however, had a long career in the game himself. Primarily a second baseman, he played in the Major Leagues for the New York Giants (1938–39) and the Washington Senators (1943–47), compiling a .283 batting average with 381 hits in 407 games played.

On May 1, 1944, Myatt went 6-for-6 for the Senators in a 11–4 victory against the Red Sox at Fenway Park.

Coach and acting manager
Myatt managed in the minor leagues before becoming a Major League coach for over 20 years with the Senators (1950–54), Chicago White Sox (1955–56), Chicago Cubs (1957–59), Milwaukee Braves (1960–61), Detroit Tigers (1962–63) and Philadelphia Phillies (1964–72). He twice served as interim manager of the Phils, in both 1968 (for one game) and 1969 (for the final third of the season). His career managerial record: 20 wins, 35 defeats (.364).

Myatt died at age 86 in Orlando, Florida.

See also
List of Major League Baseball single-game hits leaders

References

External links

George Myatt at Baseball Almanac

1914 births
2000 deaths
Baseball coaches from Colorado
Baseball players from Denver
Baton Rouge Solons players
Chattanooga Lookouts managers
Chattanooga Lookouts players
Chicago Cubs coaches
Chicago White Sox coaches
Columbus Red Birds players
Detroit Tigers coaches
Hollywood Stars players
Jersey City Giants players
Knoxville Smokies players
Major League Baseball second basemen
Major League Baseball third base coaches
Milwaukee Braves coaches
New York Giants (NL) players
Orlando Senators players
People from El Segundo, California
Philadelphia Phillies coaches
Philadelphia Phillies managers
San Antonio Missions players
San Diego Padres (minor league) players
Washington Senators (1901–1960) coaches
Washington Senators (1901–1960) players